Sultan Al-Nemri (born 1986) is a Saudi Arabian footballer who plays as a winger.

He played for Al-Ittihad in the 2008 AFC Champions League group stages.

Al-Numari has made a few appearances for the Saudi Arabia national football team, including a 2010 FIFA World Cup qualifying match.

References

1986 births
Living people
Saudi Arabian footballers
Saudi Arabia international footballers
Ittihad FC players
Al-Faisaly FC players
Al-Wehda Club (Mecca) players
Al-Hazem F.C. players
Al-Arabi SC (Saudi Arabia) players
People from Taif
Saudi First Division League players
Saudi Professional League players
Saudi Second Division players
Association football wingers